Flomaton is a town in Escambia County, Alabama, United States.  At the 2010 census the town's population was 1,440.  It is located next to the Alabama / Florida state line.

History
Flomaton was incorporated as a town in 1908, having been settled on a railway junction in 1869.  The site was a junction of different lines of the Louisville & Nashville Railroad. Into the 1960s the L&N ran trains south to the beach resort city of Pensacola, Florida. The L&N main line was a conduit for trains to New York City, Cincinnati, Atlanta and New Orleans. The name "Flomaton" was chosen as a combination of "Florida", "Alabama" and "town", reflecting the town's location on the border between the two states. In the early twentieth century, the town's economy was driven by the timber industry and the town's location at an important railway junction.

Geography
Flomaton is located at  (31.008921, -87.255746). It sits on the northern side of the border between Alabama and Florida. On the southern side of the border lies the town of Century in Florida's Escambia County.

U.S. Route 29 and U.S. Route 31 join at the town. The former, starting  to the south in Pensacola, Florida, enters the town over the state border; the latter enters the town from the west, having originated near Mobile.

The town also serves as a railway junction. The town joins CSX Transportation's Montgomery–Mobile line with its line south to Pensacola and Florida's Gulf Coast.

Demographics

2020 census

As of the 2020 United States census, there were 1,466 people, 608 households, and 416 families residing in the town.

2010 census
As of the 2010 census, the town's population was 1,440. In the 2000 census the population had been measured at 1,588.

The 2010 census counted 593 households, including 398 families. The racial makeup of the town was 69.5% White (a decrease since the 2000 census), 27.2% Black or African American (an increase), 1.6% Native American and 1.32% from two or more races. 2.3% of the population were Hispanic or Latino of any race.

Of the 593 households, 31.7% had children under the age of 18 living with them, 45.7% were married couples living together, 16.9% had a female householder with no husband present, and 32.9% were non-families. 29.3% of all households were made up of individuals, and 12.6% had someone living alone who was 65 years of age or older. The average household size was 2.43 and the average family size was 2.98.

The median age was 37.4 years (an increase from 36 in the 2000 census). There were 670 males and 770 females.

In the 2000 census, the median income for a household in the town was $25,875, and the median income for a family was $34,141. Males had a median income of $30,083 versus $15,292 for females. The per capita income for the town was $14,360. About 16.5% of families and 21.8% of the population were below the poverty line, including 31.0% of those under age 18 and 18.5% of those age 65 or over.

Government
Flomaton has an elected mayor and city council.

Education
Escambia County Public School System is the local school district.

Notable people
Sidney E. Manning, World War I soldier and Medal of Honor recipient.

References

External links 
Flomaton page of Escambia County Industrial Development Authority website
Coastal Gateway Regional Economic Development Alliance

Towns in Escambia County, Alabama
Towns in Alabama